Basta de mujeres is a 1977 Argentine sex comedy film directed by Hugo Moser and written by Jorge Basurto. It stars Alberto Olmedo and Susana Giménez.

Cast

 Alberto Olmedo
 Susana Giménez
 Gilda Lousek
 Juan Carlos Dual
 Adolfo García Grau
 César Bertrand
 Alberto Busaid
 Roberto Carnaghi
 Juan José Camero
 Susana Traverso 
 Jorge Porcel
 Jorgelina Aranda

References

External links

 

1977 films
Argentine sex comedy films
1970s sex comedy films
Films directed by Hugo Moser
1977 comedy films
1970s Argentine films